Niatia Jessica Kirkland (born October 4, 1989), better known by her stage name Lil Mama, is an American rapper, singer, actress and television presenter from Brooklyn, New York and Harlem, New York. She experienced top 10 Billboard placements at seventeen with her debut album VYP (Voice of the Young People) (2008) which debuted at #25 on the Billboard 200. The album spawned her four major singles including her staple song and dance anthem "Lip Gloss", earning her two Teen Choice Awards and Monster Single of the Year nominations at the MTV VMA's. Lil Mama gained further attention in Pop music after a collaboration with Avril Lavigne, for the remix of her hit single "Girlfriend".

Lil Mama took a hiatus from music after success of her hit single "Hustler Girl" to stay focused on serving as a judge for total of seven seasons on MTV's America's Best Dance Crew at the age of nineteen from 2008–2012, which made her one of the youngest judges on any competitive television show in history. Working with producer and fellow judge Randy Jackson, she served alongside JC Chasez, Shane Sparks, Mario Lopez, and Layla Kayleigh.

She was cast in her breakout role of the late Hip-Hop artist Lisa "Left Eye" Lopes, in the VH1 biographical film CrazySexyCool: The TLC Story, which aired in October 2013 and garnered 4.5 million views in the first night. From the success of the film, Lil Mama joined TLC on their tour for their Greatest Hits album. She got the opportunity to perform a tribute to the late rapper at the 2013 American Music Awards performing the Grammy Award winning song "Waterfalls".

Lil Mama continued to remain in the public eye, returning to music, making new tracks with fellow rapper MC Lyte on her single "Ball". She made Billboard history again with her song "Sausage" at the BET Awards. She appeared on multiple magazine covers and was back in television with Growing Up Hip Hop: Atlanta.

On June 13, 2019, she starred in the movie All In, alongside Traci Braxton.

Early life

1989-2005 
Niatia Jessica Kirkland was born in 1989 in Brooklyn, New York and is the eldest daughter of eight children. She was raised in Harlem, New York, from her kindergarten to her eighth grade year. She moved back to Brooklyn and attended Edward R. Murrow High School until her Senior year where she continued her education through independent studies. Lil Mama is a third generation of West African, Trinidadian, and Jamaican descent and the third born child. Being the oldest daughter, she got her nickname "Lil Mama". She has two older brothers and three younger brothers, one of whom is also a dancer and underground rapper along with her younger sister and last brother. She has one maternal aunt and several paternal uncles.

Kirkland faced personal and financial struggles at an early age and experienced even more poverty when her mother, Tara, was diagnosed with breast cancer, which often led Kirkland to struggle in school as she had to care for her siblings and see her mother back and forth in hospitals from procedures. Both her parents had separated when she was a young child, but Lil Mama always maintained a close relationship with her father, visiting him consistently. Her family became homeless and their mother had moved her and her siblings into a shelter due to poverty at the time. Lil Mama told Power 105.1 she stayed in the shelters for seven years from her kindergarten year until the beginning of her eighth grade year when they managed to get an apartment in the Bronx and gain more stability. Her younger sibling's father was deceased, so her mother was the Matriarch of her family. She contributed to helping her mother financially by taking up small jobs such as baking. Growing up, Kirkland witnessed many hardships in her community including gang & drug violence, teen pregnancy, and domestic violence.

After her mother Tara's fight with cancer became terminal, her mother moved in with Lil Mama's aunt and Tara's older sister. She stayed there so she could be cared for and help with the care of the younger children in her family.

As one of eight children, she began to express herself artistically by writing poetry and music. She trained at dance schools for Ballet, Jazz dance, Tap dance, South African dance, Hip-hop dance, and Street dance; she was in many competitions and recitals making her a professional dancer. She was influenced by Mc Lyte, Lil Kim, Left Eye, Missy Elliot, Lauryn Hill, and her parents. Her mother was a talented singer and her father Allen Brunner was a musician and DJ. Lil Mama decided to explore her talents further when she took interest in the Rap Culture, and from then on she continued to perfect her talent in rapping and managed to become an avid free-stylist.

Career

2006-2012: VYP (Voice of the Young People) and turmoil 

Lil Mama became known as the Voice of the Young People for being a teen sensation and connecting with her younger fans as she continued to present herself as that and embrace it in her music videos and songs. She became the Queen of Hip-Pop for mixing her rhymes with pop influences, which started after her collaboration with Avril Lavigne. She first introduced herself as the "Birth of Hip-Pop" at the 2007 MTV Video Music Awards sporting a baby-styled look. She later told MTV how she intended to spread and influence more artists to spread the genre of hip-pop. After her 2009 re-release of her single "L.I.F.E.", Mama introduced her fans to a whole new side of the darker reality that young people face. The song was followed by a music video that incorporated the themes of the song which included teen pregnancy, drug addiction, child abandonment, domestic violence, and more. This showed Lil Mama as a legitimate rapper for even adults to listen to.

Since the release of her first album, Lil Mama has been in and out of studios making new music. She released the single "Dough Boy" featuring Mishon. After that release she made appearances on tracks with other artists, including "Turn it up" with Mishon and "Sexiest" by Yahaira. She also released "On & On & On", and "NYNYLALA" featuring Snoop Dogg. The two singles were intended to be a part of her second studio album, but instead they were released on iTunes and digital download but were later removed for unknown reasons. She then released two more singles entitled "Scrawberry" and "Hustler Girl", both singles were followed by music videos. Scrawberry introduced a new look for Lil Mama, in which she would wear colorful wigs and futuristic attire; this would be her new style for next few years; however, the song was released on her MySpace page and YouTube, it was unclear if it was removed from streaming services along with her other two singles. "Hustler Girl" garnered $1.5 million which topped the income she received from her Billboard hits "Shawty Get Loose" and Lip Gloss which earned her $1 million and $800,000. Her next collaboration to follow "Billionaire" would earn her $1.8 million.

Lil Mama made appearances on every red carpet in every award show. She was featured on many remixes of award-winning songs, one most notable being Lil Wayne's "A Milli"; she was brought on stage at his concerts to perform the song. Lil Mama was even featured in the Grammy Award-nominated album First Love by artist Karina Pasian a close friend to Mama and veteran music artist. In 2009, she announced the title of her proposed sophomore album as Voice Of The Young People: I Am That, after her single "What It Is" failed to chart. The song "What It Is" was the last single with a music video to be added to her album and was used to commercialize the album. When the song failed to chart, it flopped her album sales, putting her in hot water.

On October 7, 2012, RCA Music Group announced it was disbanding J Records along with Arista Records and Jive Records. With the shutdown, Lil Mama (and all other artists previously signed to these three labels) would release future material on the RCA Records brand. However Lil Mama had left Jive Records before the transition to RCA; she stated in an interview that she was not in the right space to make music and decided to take a hiatus. Voice Of The Young People: I Am That, the proposed second studio album would have had guest appearances including Soulja Boy, Khalil, Angel Haze, LoLa Monroe, Teyana Taylor, Trina, Keke Palmer, Nas, Chris Brown among others. Due to her leaving Jive, the album never saw a release and instead it along with the few singles recorded with Zomba Records were shelved. But she managed to release some the songs directly online for her fans which included "Scrawberry", "On & On & On", and "NY NY LA LA feat. Snoop Dogg". The other singles she planned to record with the featured artist were never recorded and were disbanded. From her leaving Jive, Lil Mama became an independent artist.

On June 13, 2012, America's Best Dance Crew came to a series finale. Lil Mama had served as a judge for a total of seven seasons. The following year she released a single on her Myspace page called "As Bad As Me", which was later added to YouTube.

2013-17: VH1's TLC: CrazySexyCool, "Sausage", Take Me Back and The Falicia Blakely Story 
In October 2013, Lil Mama starred as Lisa "Left Eye" Lopes in the VH1 TLC biographical film CrazySexyCool: The TLC Story, which aired on October 21, 2013, alongside Keke Palmer and Drew Sidora, who played Rozonda "Chilli" Thomas and Tionne "T-Boz" Watkins, respectively. The movie generated 4.5 million views in one night. This was her first acting debut and breakout role, in which she received positive feedback from Left Eye's fans. Lil Mama was the first to be cast and from both the success of the movie and the close relationship she formed with T-Boz and Chilli. The group TLC took a chance on Lil Mama, allowing her to substitute for the late Lisa Left-Eye Lopes. TLC took Lil Mama on tour, and Lil Mama carried out Left Eye's legacy by rapping her verses. Lil Mama's journey with TLC came to end after they performed at 2013 American Music Awards Lil Mama and TLC dedicated a performance of Waterfalls for the late Left Eye. After the tribute, Lil Mama and TLC parted ways, and Lil Mama went on to return to making music.

In November 2014, Lil Mama and AV were featured on MC Lyte Lyte's album Legend, and Lyte's first music video in years, "Ball". The music video was released on November 13, 2014. Lil Mama appeared in the video with both artists, providing rap verses, along with some of her signature dance moves. The same year she performed the song live with AV and Mc Lyte on The Real.

In May 2015, Lil Mama released the video for her song "Sausage" on WorldStarHipHop. The song was inspired by The Sausage movement on Vine, after Lil Mama heard two girls on a street corner following the trend. The video incorporates many themes including Teenage Mutant Ninja Turtles, Voguing, Mary J. Blige, Caribbean love, and Community Fun. It immediately went viral, with more than 3 million views in its first week, topping the Billboard Music + Twitter charts, passing Maroon 5's "Sugar" and knocking out Jason Derulo's "Want to Want Me". It held itself steady in the top 20 well into June, with numerous dance studio and dance jams featuring choreography and routines on social media danced to the Sausage track.

Lil Mama got a chance to perform the song live during half time of the 2015 BET Hip Hop Awards. The track was not made available for sale, being absent from both iTunes and Amazon.com due to copyright issues from the inspirations referenced and sampled (the track listed on the YouTube video is actually "Mona Lisa" by Slick Rick) the track was only available on the Lil Mama SoundCloud account only and her website. The video also opted out of advertising revenue on YouTube, with no ads appearing before the music video. The following year she released another single "Memes" as a response to memes made of her after her notorious interview on The Breakfast Club. Lil Mama released Take Me Back, a mixtape which featured "Sausage" and "Memes". The mixtape was later up for sale on her website and Soundcloud account, it featured seven songs including a cover and re-edition of Rihanna's "Work". The song received mixed reviews online both on YouTube and her website. People were not fond of her vocals on the hook, but adored her choreography. The last song to be added was "Too Fly", which caught less attraction after her website was taken down for unknown reasons. Too Fly was a video filmed in a club featuring her younger brother Arnstar as one of the dancers. She also produced her singing vocals on the hook. The song was also another copyright issue that couldn't be made for sale and solely released through her mixtape and her soundcloud page. The music video is a YouTube exclusive.

After her acting debut, Lil Mama made what SOHH called an "Epic Comeback". Lil Mama was back on red carpets, Award Shows, Talk Shows, and magazine covers. In 2016 Lil Mama made an appearance on Hip Hop Squares as contestant; the episode was highlighted because of the controversy Tamar Braxton started with the host. That same year Lil Mama, alongside Dej Loaf, gave a tribute to Lil' Kim at the VH1 Hip Hop Honors, Kim thanked Mama later with a post of the tribute on her Instagram page.

In June 2015, Mama was listed as a featured speaker at an event sponsored by BET and the Hip Hop Sisters Network. Titled "Women, Wealth and Relationships," the event also featured guest speakers MC Lyte, Shanice and Elise Neal, as well as main speaker and financial advisor specialist Lynn Richardson. The event, held on June 27, 2015, focuses on empowering black women both in their lives and financially, providing answers on such tough issues as men, money and family relationships.

On August 28, 2017, Mama returned to acting, starring in the television movie When Love Kills: The Falicia Blakely Story, based on a true story. It premiered to 1.6 million viewers, ranking as TV One's #1 original movie premiere of all time among all key demos. Lil Mama along with director Tasha Smith, and her co-stars Tami Roman and Lance Gross went on a tour to promote the movie and share Falicia Blakely's story.

2018- Shoe Game, Growing Up Hip Hop, and present
On April 17, 2018, Lil Mama became competitor on MTV's The Challenge: Champs vs. Stars a competitive television mini-series in which celebrities would team up with pro-athlete champions against each other. There she met Drake Bell, and the two would later go on to collaborate on his track "Call Me When You're Lonely".

On May 3, 2018, Lil Mama released a Single titled "Shoe Game". The Single was available everywhere online for Sale, Streaming, and digital Download. The Single was later followed by a music video directed by Walu, on the May 25, 2018. It Became a YouTube Exclusive, following a million and twenty thousand views within five months. Lil Mama went on to promote the single on TRL A.M. morning show in late September informing that this will lead to a future album. She was then followed up by Brynn Elliott after discussion of her old album and viewing of her greatest music videos which included "Lip Gloss", "Shawty Get Loose", and "G-Slide (Tour Bus)" .

On September 9, 2018, Lil Mama was Presenter for the 2018 BET Special Black Girls Rock! she had the privilege to work with artists such as Queen Latifah, Janet Jackson, Mary J. Blige, etc. She presented the award to Shanay Thompson for her M.A.D. GIRLS Celebrated by Coca-Cola. On September 25, 2018,0 Entertainment Tonight announced that Lil Mama would join the cast of The CW All American as a supporting character Chynna Q. this would be her first acting role since the Falicia Blakely Story.

On October 4, 2018, Lil Mama appeared on T.V. One's morning talk show Sister Circle to discuss her latest single "Shoe Game", and her being cast on Growing Up Hip Hop: Atlanta. There she stated that she will be joining the cast as a regular due to her move to Atlanta to work on her upcoming album that Bow Wow will be assisting to co-produce and allow the show to document her journey as well as her experiences. On the Show she also got to discuss her acting career, as well as her taking vocal lessons from R&B Singer Kelly Price, her singing will debut on the intended album.

On October 18, 2018, Growing Up Hip Hop: Atlanta premiered for the continuation of its second season. Lil Mama made her debut on the first episode alongside Kiyomi Leslie and Masika Kalysha as replacement for cast members who quit. Lil Mama stars alongside her mentor and new manager MC Lyte. On November 14, 2018, Lil Mama made her debut appearance on the CW's All American in its fifth episode. She introduced her character: An upcoming Hip Hop artist Chynna Q. The girlfriend of one of the protagonists of father; a wealthy and successful Mogul who is promoting her career.

On June 13, 2019, she starred in the movie All In, alongside Traci Braxton.

Personal life
Lil Mama's mother, Tara Kirkland, died on December 15, 2007, following a four-year battle with breast cancer. Lil Mama's music video for "Shawty Get Loose" was dedicated to her memory; the single won her a Teen Choice Award. Tara also happened to be featured in the intro and closing of Lil Mama's music video for her hit single "Lip Gloss". Lil Mama had taken over guardianship over her younger siblings along with the help of her family and older brothers. She spoke about this at the MTV red carpet. Lil Mama has stated she and her mother had a close relationship and her mother relied on her for the help in raising her younger siblings.

Lil Mama is the older sister of underground rapper and dancer Arnstar, who was a regular on Nick Cannon's Wild 'n Out series on MTV. He is also dancer in the New York City street dancing crew W.A.F.F.L.E. Their crew garnered more recognition after making their appearance on The Ellen DeGeneres Show and received a cash reward from Ellen herself.

At the 2009 MTV Video Music Awards, Lil Mama came onstage while Jay-Z and Alicia Keys performed "Empire State of Mind". While Jay-Z was ending his final verse, Lil Mama left her seat in the audience, got onto the stage, and started bobbing her head to the beat. Jay-Z was surprised but continued to perform. Right before this moment, Beyonce had tried to hold her from going up. Jay-Z patted Lil Mama on the leg to fall back, jokingly telling her, "you T-Paining now," a reference to a similar incident two months earlier when T-Pain jumped on stage with Jay-Z at Summer Jam during his performance of "D.O.A.". At the end of the performance, Lil Mama came to foreground and posed alongside Jay-Z and Keys. She later clarified that she "would never ... try to disrespect Jay-Z or take a moment that someone has created it and try to relive it. I'm too original for that and I respect him too much for that." In October 2009, she appeared in cycle 13 of America's Next Top Model with Benny Ninja.

On August 11, 2011, Lil Mama was a guest on The Breakfast Club. While on the air, tensions rose between her and fellow DJ Charlamagne tha God as they exchanged jabs, with Charlamagne bringing up her VMA incident and the controversy between her and Nicki Minaj. Two more DJ's, Angela Yee and DJ Envy, chimed in, discussing her absence from music at the time. After some time, Lil Mama broke down in tears when her mother's passing was brought up. Lil Mama crying spawned numerous memes around the internet. Five years later Lil Mama returned to the Breakfast Club to explain why she cried, and the DJ's and Lil Mama exchanged apologies with one another.

On March 10, 2016, Lil Mama was arrested for driving 38 mph in a 25 mph speed zone and not having her license. The incident took place in Harlem around 4am. Officers conducted an investigation and Lil Mama's driver's license was revoked. She went on to make a statement apologizing to her family, friends, and fans.

Bow Wow set Lil Mama on blind date with his friend BT, a radio personality, in December, 2018, and caused controversy by allegedly saying that "Y'all going to be F**king in a week". This was aired on their show Growing Up Hip Hop: Atlanta, and Lil Mama posted on Instagram to address the episode, calling out Bow and his girlfriend.

Discography

Studio albums
 VYP (Voice of the Young People) (2008)

Filmography

Television

Awards and nominations

BET Awards

|-
|2008
| rowspan="2" style="text-align:center;"| Herself 
| rowspan="2" style="text-align:center;"| Best Female Hip-Hop Artist 
|
|-
|2009
| 
|}

MTV Video Music Awards

|-
| style="text-align:center;"| 2007
| style="text-align:center;"|"Lip Gloss"
| style="text-align:center;"| Monster Single of the Year
| 
|}

MTV Asia Awards

|-
| style="text-align:center;"| 2008
| style="text-align:center;"| "Girlfriend (Remix)" 
| style="text-align:center;"| Best Hook Up
|
|}

Teen Choice Awards

|-
| rowspan="2" style="text-align:center;"| 2007
| style="text-align:center;"| Herself
| style="text-align:center;"| Choice Rap Artist
|
|-
| style="text-align:center;"| "Lip Gloss"
| style="text-align:center;"| Choice Summer Song
|
|-
| rowspan="3" style="text-align:center;"|2008
| rowspan="2" style="text-align:center;"| "Shawty Get Loose" 
| style="text-align:center;"| Choice Music Hook Up
|
|-
| style="text-align:center;"| Choice Rap/Hip-Hop Track
|
|-
| style="text-align:center;"| Herself
| style="text-align:center;"| Choice TV Personality: Randy Jackson's America's Best Dance Crew
|
|}

Vibe Awards

|-
| style="text-align:center;"| 2007
| style="text-align:center;"| "Lip Gloss"
| style="text-align:center;"| Ringtone of the Year
|
|}

References

External links

 Lil Mama
 

1989 births
21st-century American actresses
21st-century American businesspeople
African-American female dancers
Dancers from New York (state)
African-American women singer-songwriters
African-American women rappers
American film actresses
American dance musicians
American hip hop dancers
American hip hop singers
Businesspeople from New York City
East Coast hip hop musicians
Jive Records artists
Living people
RCA Records artists
Rappers from Brooklyn
Pop rappers
The Challenge (TV series) contestants
21st-century American rappers
21st-century African-American women singers
Edward R. Murrow High School alumni
21st-century American businesswomen
Singer-songwriters from New York (state)
21st-century women rappers